Guy Chasseuil (born 26 January 1942 in Paris) is a French former racing driver. During his racing career he specialized in rallying and endurance racing.

Career
Guy Chasseuil's first major race was the 1966 24 Hours of Spa, driving an  NSU 1000 TT.

Chasseuil began his career in the early 1960s in the French Rally Championship, first with co-driver Jean Todt, then Christian Baron. He achieved success in African rallies, but only raced the Paris Dakar once in 1981 in a Porsche 924.

Although he remained active in rallying throughout his career, he achieved notable successes in road and circuit racing. In 1968 he made his debut at the 24 Hours of Le Mans, and one year later won the 24-hour race at Spa-Francorchamps with his longtime teammate Claude Ballot-Léna. In 1970, he celebrated his first class victory at Le Mans, when he finished sixth overall with Ballot-Léna in a Porsche 914/6 GT. In 1970, he partnered with Ove Andersson and Björn Waldegård at the Marathon de la Route at the Nürburgring, where the trio placed third overall.

Over the course of his career Chasseuil had twelve Le Mans starts. He came closest to an overall win in 1975 as a works driver with Ligier. Chasseuil and partner Jean-Louis Lafosse piloted one of three Ligier JS2s. The duo was to drive a conservative race and bring the Ligier safely to the finish. When two JS2s retired during the night, however, team management changed tactics and let the Chasseuil/Lafosse car chase the leaders. The two gradually moved up the field, finishing second to the Gulf GR8 of Jacky Ickx and Derek Bell because they ran out of time.

He continued racing sports cars until the early 1980s, appearing at the Sarthe for the last time in 1981. Chasseuil was one of three driving the 917 K/81 for Kremer Racing. The modified twelve-year old design was not competitive, and retired after only 82 laps having damaged an oil line during an off-course excursion.

In the early 1980s Chasseuil also appeared in some World Rally Championship races. At the 1982 Tour de Corse, he drove a Ferrari 308GTB supplied by the French Ferrari importer Charles Pozzi. Ten years earlier he had driven a Ford GT40 in the same rally.

After his racing career ended he became a stuntman/stunt-driver, and worked on films such as  Le Mans, and  Ronin.

Major races
 24 Hours of Le Mans:
  place in 1975 with Jean-Louis Lafosse in a Ligier JS2
  overall, GT Class winner in 1970 with Claude Ballot-Léna in Porsche 914/6 GT
 24 Hours of Spa:
  place in 1967 in a Ford Mustang with Georges Bossuyt
 Winner in 1969 in a Porsche 911 with Claude Ballot-Léna
 Tour de France automobile
  place in 1969 in a Porsche 911
  place in 1970 in a Porsche 911S
 Coupe du Salon
  place in 1969 in Porsche 911S
 Rallye de l'Ouest
 Winner in 1970 in a Porsche 911. Team Sonauto BP, codriver Christian Baron
 Critérium de Touraine
 Winner in 1970 in a Porsche 911 Gr.4
 1000 km of Paris
  place in 1970 in a Porsche 908
 3 Hours of Le Mans
 Winner in 1971 in a Porsche 908 with Claude Ballot-Léna
 Rallye du Maroc
  in 1971 in a Peugeot 504
 Rally Lyon-Charbonnières
  in 1973 in a Ford Escort GT/E
 Tour de Corse
  place in 1973 in a Ford Escort GT/E
 Rallye Côte d'Ivoire
  place in 1974 in a Datsun 180 BSSS
  place in 1975 in a Datsun 180B
 4 Hours of Le Mans
 Winner in 1974 in a Ligier JS2
 Rallye de l'Ouest
 Winner in 1974 in a Porsche 911
 Rallye de Lorraine
  place in 1974 in a Porsche 911 Carrera
 Rallye du Mont-Blanc
  place in 1974 in a Porsche 911 Carrera
 Ronde cévenole
  place in 1974 in a Porsche 911 Carrera
 French Rally Championship
 Winner in Groupe 3 in 1974 in a Porsche 911
 Monte Carlo Rally
  place in 1985, in a Volkswagen Golf GTI

Racing record

Complete 24 Hours of Le Mans results

Complete 24 Hours of Spa results

References

External links
 
 
 

1942 births
24 Hours of Le Mans drivers
24 Hours of Spa drivers
French racing drivers
French rally drivers
Racing drivers from Paris
World Sportscar Championship drivers
Stunt drivers
Living people